El Gran Desafío (2010) (Spanish for "The Great Challenge")  was a professional wrestling supercard event produced by Mexican professional wrestling promotion International Wrestling Revolution Group (IWRG), and took place on March 21, 2010 in Arena Naucalpan, Naucalpan, State of Mexico, Mexico.

In the main event then-IWRG Intercontinental Lightweight Champion Dr. Cerebro defeated El Hijo del Diablo to win the WWS World Welterweight Championship in a match where both championships were on the line. The show included four additional matches.

Storylines
The event featured six professional wrestling matches with different wrestlers involved in pre-existing scripted feuds, plots and storylines. Wrestlers were portrayed as either heels (referred to as rudos in Mexico, those that portray the "bad guys") or faces (técnicos in Mexico, the "good guy" characters) as they followed a series of tension-building events, which culminated in a wrestling match or series of matches.

Event
The show saw several substations compared to the originally announced event, Oficial 911 worked both his scheduled match as well as substituting Veneno in the fourth match of the night. Maldito was originally slated to team with his "La Ola Maldita" partner Samot, but instead he teamed up with Gringo Loco without any explanation for the substitution.

Aftermath
Dr. Cerebro would successfully defend the WWS World Welterweight Championship against Decnnis on September 16, 2010, but ended up losing the championship to Multifacetico on June 2, 2011. He would later have a second reign from June 29 to October 22, 2014.

Results

References

External links 
IWRG official website

2010 in Mexico
2010 in professional wrestling
2010
March 2010 events in Mexico